In 1939 Dodge presented a completely new designed line of pickups and trucks. Formally the T series for 1939, V series for 1940, and the W series from 1941 through 1947, the trucks became mostly known as the Dodge Job-Rated trucks.

With streamlined, Art Deco styled front sheetmetal, and introducing the concept of "Job-Rated" truck configurations, Dodge tried to offer customers the truck that fit the job they were buying it for.
As a result, the 1939 to 1947 Dodge pickup / truck range was offered in a bewilderingly large number of available variants and model codes.

Six different payload classes, a wide range of bodies, and more than twenty different wheelbase-lengths were manufactured, and fitted with different sized versions of the Chrysler-sourced inline six-cylinder side-valve engines — from the half-ton TC pickup on a 116-inch wheelbase to three-ton tractor cabs. Nevertheless, mechanically, the trucks were all very similar, with solid axles front and rear and leaf springs at all four corners. With World War II taking up most of production capacity from 1942 to 1945, the 1939 styling continued largely unchanged through 1947, as engineering and production became the main focus.

The Dodge trucks enjoyed some popularity before the war, and the last of them built in 1942, before Dodge turned to mostly military production, had progressed to the
W-series model name. When they resumed sales post-war, they continued as the 1946 Dodge W-series.

Historic author on Dodge trucks, Don Bunn, noted that the 1939 to 1947 Job-Rated trucks represent a very significant segment in Dodge history. They were the first to be mass-produced in the new, huge (Mound Road) Warren truck plant. The Job-Rated trucks also formed the basis for Dodge's first light-duty military four-wheel drives, the 1940 half-ton Dodge VC series, which in turn further developed into the world's first factory 4WD commercial pickups: the Dodge Power Wagon. And lastly, Dodge was the first of the Big Three U.S. auto manufacturers to offer a diesel powered truck — all the more exceptional, given that Chrysler engineered and built their heavy-duty diesel engines all in-house. Today, this series is the most popular pickups with Dodge truck collectors.

General

After Dodge joined forces with Graham Brothers trucks from 1925 onwards, Dodge and Graham trucks, marketed through Dodge's vast dealer network, were offered in various capacities, ranging from a half ton to three tons. In May 1928 Power Wagon magazine already computed a "truly impressive" 1,842 possible configuration combinations, of available models, styles, payload ratings and other options.

For 1939, Dodge rolled out a striking, modern design, new from the ground up, except for the updated drivetrains – and, as before, offering an exceptionally large number of available variants. In the later 1930s, streamlined styling had become a virtual requirement for anything from appliances, cars, boats, planes — even trucks, trains, and architecture.  The new, 'Job-Rated' Dodge trucks followed suit, and were completely representative of the 'Streamline Moderne', Art Deco based style, inspired by aerodynamic design, and characterized by elongated horizontal lines and curving forms, to give the impression of sleekness and modernity.

The all new, all-steel cabs featured a front-end design with a barrel-shaped base, and a sharp V-shaped grille; long, sleek, crowned front and rear fenders, with embossed "speed lines" on the lower rears of each fender – and a new sloped, two-piece windshield, that could be opened for increased airflow. The headlamps were still free-standing, but were mounted in bullet-shaped pods. From the half-tons to the three-ton models, the new trucks all featured the same distinctive design – the heavy-duty models only stood out taller, on larger wheels and tires.

The unique styling of the trucks, was only really changed in 1940, when Dodge trucks began using sealed-beam headlamps and were equipped with marker lights mounted on the headlamp housing. For the most part, after 1940, year-to-year appearance changes were very minimal. The grille design was slightly changed again in 1941, and this style continued through 1947, except for the lower chrome strips, which were omitted post war.

The Job-Rated trucks had stronger frames than previous Dodge trucks, using steel with a higher tensile strength, and the frame-rails extended further forward past the engine than before, such that the truck's beefy, channel-type bumpers tied the rails together, reinforcing the frame. After World War II, several changes were made to production truck chassis parts, based on reliability experience gained during military service – for instance stronger differentials and larger axle shafts were used in post-war trucks, and steering boxes were beefed up as well.

All in all, Dodge advertised as many as 175 basic chassis models, and seven engine variants, as well as different "job-rated" choices of clutches, transmissions, axles, gear ratios, springs, tires and brakes. In 1941, General Motors introduced new trucks for Chevrolet and GMC, that literally became known as their Art Deco trucks, and advertised them as "The Right Trucks for all Trades". Both Dodge's 'job-rated' trucks, and GM's 'Art-Decos' are recognized as prime truck examples of the 1930s Streamline Moderne architecture and design style.

Model name codes
Introduced as the T-Series for the 1939 model year, the line evolved into the V-series for 1940, and W-series for 1941, but the 'W' was retained until the end of sales in 1947.

The bottom of the range TC, and its successors VC and WC, were -ton rated, on a  wheelbase. As the second letter in the model code progressed in the alphabet, the payload rating typically also went up, however this was not implemented consistently. Although the TD-15, VD-15 and WD-15 were -ton rated, the TD-20 and -21 and its later VD and WD versions were one-tonners. Second letter 'E' models only existed in the form of the 1939 TE versions. The K-lettered models were consistently 3-ton rated, but the L-lettered models went against the naming pattern – they were only 2-ton rated. Both were offered in wheelbases ranging  through 1942.

Engine
Dodge's Job-Rated trucks used flathead sixes, originally developed by Plymouth, throughout the 1939–1947 range.

Starting in 1942 (just before civilian production ended), the 201.3 cu.in. engines were dropped from the range, and the -ton light-duty models received the larger 218 cu.in. six, like the 3/4-ton pickups, going up to  gross after the war, while the one-ton trucks got a larger 230.2 cu.in.
A three-speed manual was standard issue, while a four-speed with a compound first gear was an option.

The 1939–1947 TK- and TL- through WK- and WL-models were also available with a diesel engine – Dodge's own diesel engine – Dodge and Mack Trucks were the only two American automakers of the period before World War II, to have their own diesel engines. An additional 6-volt auxiliary generator debuted in 1941 on the diesel engines. The unit furnished power for lighting, instruments, and horns. Diesel sales were extremely limited however, counting as many as 75 units sold in 1939, 134 units in 1940, and 195 rigs in 1941.

Bodies and options
Besides with the  "Express" pick-up bodywork, the Job-Rated trucks were available in cab/chassis, cowl/chassis, or bare chassis (for third party custom body) versions.

At the bottom of the range, Dodge offered the three now common pick-up classes (-ton, -ton and one-ton), as well as a 1-ton pick-up. Dodge's half-ton pickups, on a  wheelbase with a 7-foot box, were changed to the 70 HP 201 cu.in. L-head straight-six. The 3/4- and 1-ton models kept the 75 HP 218 cubic inch L-head six, either on a  wheelbase with a 7-foot box, or a  wheelbase with a 9-foot bed. Dodge's 1-ton pick-up, offered from the Job-Rated trucks launch in 1939 until the 1942 switch to all-wartime production, consisted of the long-wheelbase one-ton model with 9-foot bed, but on bigger wheels and tires.

Aside from as pickups, the lightest models in the range, the  wheelbase TC/VC/WC half-tons, were also offered as a delivery truck, either with solid steel "panel" van body, or open canvas-covered canopy or screenside configuration.

After the war, both the 1-ton pickup, and the long one-ton pickup with the nine-foot bed were dropped.
Post-war available equipment options included a larger clutch, four-speed transmission, oversize tires, electric driver's wiper, heater, chrome windshield frame, adjustable visor, driver's armrest, dome light, turn signals, "airfoam" seat with leather upholstery, and an AM radio.

Models used by the military

Purpose-built four-wheel drive

After Dodge supplied the U.S. Army with its first four-wheel drive truck in 1934, more modern -tonners were developed, and 1,700 RF-40-X-4(USA) trucks were supplied in 1938, and 292 TF-40-X-4(USA) in 1939. In 1940, Dodge gained an Army contract to design and build -ton 4×4 military trucks in several styles using many commercial truck parts. Based on the VC-Series, and internally called the T-202 series, the VC-1 through VC-6 came with essentially stock front-end sheetmetal. Similarly, their 116-inch wheelbase and 201-cubic-inch 79-horsepower six-cylinder engine shared much with Dodge's civilian -ton VC. The following year, the T202 was replaced by the T-207 series trucks. Again rated as -tonners, they featured a military-specific hood, grille, and fenders. These trucks were powered by the 218-cubic-inch six of 85 horsepower taken from Dodge's - and one-ton commercial models. Eventually, the military trucks were substantially redesigned, and uprated to -tons with a 230-cubic-inch engine with 92 hp. Together with the 1941 -tons, these were built from 1942 until the end of the war as the Dodge WC series military trucks. Some 30 were modified as armored trucks by the French in Syria prior to WWII and known as the Automitrailleuse Dodge Tanake. The Tanake was fitted with a 37mm cannon M1916 and two or three FM 24/29 light machine guns and a crew of 5. The vehicles served with French Foreign Legion, both Vichy and Free French units during WWII and post-war used by the Syrian government in the 1948 Arab–Israeli War.

Stock models and specifications

The U.S. military also used some of Dodge's light truck models in mostly stock, two-wheel drive form. Technical manuals of U.S. Army military vehicles offer some more detailed specifications on three such models: the 1947 model year WC and WD-15 models, and the 160 inch wheelbase version of the SNL G-number 618 aka the WF-32.

Additionally there were 4x2, civilian based variants built either as Canadian "Modified Conventional Pattern" or "Canadian Military Pattern trucks", called the D15 (15cwt, or ¾-ton – engineering code T-222), and the D60S and D60L (60cwt, or 3-ton, engineering code T-110, with a short  or long  wheelbase). The Canadian models were built with a  engine with a 25" block, that was unique to them, and they had beefed up rear axles. Chrysler Corporation of Canada produced a total of 180,816 military Dodge trucks during 1939-1945.

Dodge T-234 "China / Burma" truck
A special case in between stock commercial and dedicated military trucks, was the T-234 "China / Burma Road" truck, which was built as part of the Allied cooperation with China against Japan, in the war and just thereafter. From October 1944 through March 1946, Dodge built 15,000 trucks, that used a special order combination of their most heavy-duty off-the-shelf components, to overland supplies from India to China over the very rough  Ledo Road (later renamed after Joseph Stilwell), to an extent to specifications personally drawn up by Generalissimo Chiang Kai-shek, then president and commander of the Nationalist Chinese forces. Chiang Kai-shek asked Roosevelt himself for 15,000 two-and-a-half-ton trucks capable of handling the Burma Road, requiring them to have an engine of at least 300 cubic inches and a 5-speed transmission.
The trucks were built with a near standard civilian closed cab – right-hand drive because Burma was under British rule – but fitted with a flat, military-style grille & brush guard, and wide open, almost flat fenders, to avoid mud build-up clogging the wheels rotating, and otherwise stood out by having a 60-gallon fuel tank. In order for the trucks to function on the gruelling  journey over the Himalayas, Dodge fitted not only heavy-duty springs and steering gear, but went sofar as to fit tri-metal aircraft grade bearings and aeroplane-type shock absorbers. Radiators were fitted with an overflow tank, to return the cooled water to the sealed cooling system. Front axles were widened to give wider tread. Nevertheless, the average life of the trucks was only about five trips.

It has been commented that the front sheet metal design of the T-234 Burma Dodge shows remarkable resemblance to that of the post-war Dodge Power Wagons, and may well have influenced it.

Specifications table
This table offers specifications for a few high-profile models in the extensive 1939–1947 range only.

Model table

Dodge offered their 1939–1947 'Job-Rated' trucks in many variants. complemented with information about Dodge engine & engineering codes from the same website,.

Models with a "D" as the third letter in the model code, and marked with "D" behind the engine code, indicate models that were offered with a diesel engine.

See also
 Chevrolet AK / BK / etc. series – a contemporaneous American truck series, popularly called the Chevy 'Art Deco' trucks.

Notes

References

External links

T- V- W-Series (1939-1947)
Pickup trucks
Rear-wheel-drive vehicles
1940s cars
Military vehicles introduced in the 1930s